Nobel/Lumsden Air Park  is located adjacent to Nobel, Ontario, Canada.

See also
Nobel/Sawdust Bay Water Aerodrome

References

Registered aerodromes in Parry Sound District

pms:Nobel - Sawdust Bay Water Aerodrome